Biohit Oyj is a Finnish company which develops, manufactures, and markets biotech and diagnostics products for use in research and health care.

Summary
He stepped down from the CEO position in June 2011, but remains actively involved with the company through positions on several advisory boards. Biohit is a globally operating Finnish biotechnology company. Biohit is headquartered in Helsinki and has subsidiaries in Italy and the UK. Biohit's Series B share (BIOBV) is quoted on NASDAQ OMX Helsinki since 1999, Small cap/Healthcare. Semi Korpela was appointed CEO in 2011.

Markets
Biohit's two businesses are acetaldehyde eliminating products and diagnostics. More than 90% of Biohit's sales occur outside Finland.

Diagnostic tests
The diagnostic product range of Biohit includes the GastroPanel examinations, which are used to aid diagnosis of Helicobacter pylori infection and atrophic gastritis from a blood sample. They are also ideal tools for identification of patients at increased risk of gastric cancer, peptic ulcer disease, gastroesophageal reflux disease (GERD) and deficiencies of vitamin B12, calcium and iron. In addition to this, Biohit offers Quick tests for the detection of
Lactose intolerance
Helicobacter pylori infection
Celiac disease
Screening of colorectal cancer

Acetaldehyde binding products
In 2018 was launched a new, nicotine free smoking cessation product, Acetium Lozenge.

Monoclonal antibodies
Biohit also develops and manufactures monoclonal antibodies for research use and use as raw materials for diagnostic industry.

Instruments
Adopting a systems approach, Biohit also provides laboratory equipment, such as microplate instruments and automates, as well as liquid handling products to support Biohit ELISA tests.

Distribution network
A network of 40 distributors, including 2 subsidiaries, in more than 40 countries is selling Biohit products. In the U.S. the official distributor is Bio Testing Supplies, a division of Avrio Genetics.

Research, development, and intellectual property
Biohit spends roughly 30% of net sales on basic research each year and pursues an aggressive patenting strategy.

References

External links
 

Companies established in 1988
Biotechnology companies of Finland
Chemical companies of Finland
Companies listed on Nasdaq Helsinki